Murg may refer to:

Places
 Murg (Aare), a river of Switzerland
 Murg (Northern Black Forest), a river and right tributary of the Rhine in the districts of Freudenstadt and Rastatt, Baden-Württemberg, Germany
 Murg Valley Railway
 Murg (Southern Black Forest), a river and right tributary of the Rhine in the Waldshut district, Baden-Württemberg, Germany
 Murg (Thur), a river of Switzerland
 Murg, Baden-Württemberg, a municipality in the district of Waldshut in Baden-Württemberg, Germany
 Murg (Baden) station, a railway station
 Murg, St. Gallen, a settlement of the municipality of Quarten in the Swiss canton of St. Gallen
 Murg railway station

People
 Thomas Murg (born 1994), Austrian footballer

Other uses
 MurG an abbreviated name for Undecaprenyldiphospho-muramoylpentapeptide beta-N-acetylglucosaminyltransferase

See also
 
 Murk (disambiguation)